Jai Shri Ram is an expression in Indic languages, translating as "Glory to Lord Rama" or "Victory to Lord Rama". The proclamation has been used by Hindus as an informal greeting, as a symbol of adhering to Hindu faith, or for projection of varied faith-centered emotions.

The expression was used by the Indian Hindu nationalist organisations Vishva Hindu Parishad (VHP), Bharatiya Janata Party (BJP) and their allies, which embraced the slogan in the late 20th century as a tool of increasing the visibility of Hinduism in public spaces and went on to use it as a battle cry. The slogan has since then been employed for perpetration of communal violence against people of other faiths.

Antecedents

Religious 
Photojournalist Prashant Panjiar wrote about how in the city Ayodhya female pilgrims always chant "Sita-Ram-Sita-Ram", while the older male pilgrims prefer not to use Rama's name at all. The traditional usage of "Jai" in a slogan was with "Siyavar Ramchandraji ki jai" ("Victory to Sita's husband Rama"). A popular greeting invoking Ram is "Jai Ram ji ki" and "Ram-Ram".

"Rama" greetings have been traditionally used by people irrespective of religion.

Rama symbolism 
The worship of Rama increased significantly in the 12th century, following the invasions of Muslim Turks. The Ramayana became widely popular in the 16th century. It is argued that the story of Rama offers a "very powerful imaginative formulation of the divine king as the only being capable of combating evil". The concept of Ramrajya, "the rule of Ram", was used by Gandhi to describe the ideal country free from the British.

The most widely known political use of Ram began with Baba Ram Chandra's peasant movement in Awadh in the 1920s. He encouraged the use of "Sita-Ram" as opposed to the then widely used "Salaam" as a greeting, since the latter implied social inferiority. "Sita-Ram" soon became a rallying cry.

Journalist Mrinal Pande states:

RSS chief Mohan Bhagwat while addressing a gathering at Vigyan Bhawan in Delhi said:

Debate 
Shastri Kosalendradas, HOD of Philosophy and Yoga at Jagadguru Ramanandacharya Rajasthan Sanskrit University Jaipur wrotes about how nowadays there is a debate on which of the slogans "Jai Shri Ram" or "Jai Siya Ram" is older? As a result of increasing conflict between cultural harmony, politics is at its peak regarding the words "Shri" and "Siya", associated with the name of Rama. Although both the words "Shri" and "Siya"  signifies Shakti.  Still, instead of accepting both the expressions, both the parties are making statements on them. 

In December 2022, Congress leader Rahul Gandhi while giving a speech in Madhya Pradesh attacked BJP and RSS by raising the question "Why they always chants "Jai Shri Ram" and not "Jai Siya Ram". Reacting to his question, a minister in Madhya Pradesh and a senior BJP leader Narottam Mishra replied “I think Rahul Gandhi’s knowledge is only limited to children’s rhyme ‘Baa Baa Black Sheep', the name of Ram is prefixed with ‘Shri’ which is also used for Lord Vishnu’s wife Lakshmi and Sita Ji”. BJP's Amit Malviya also reacted to Rahul Gandhi's attack by posting a video in which Prime Minister Narendra Modi started his Ram Mandir ground breaking ceremony speech with "Jai Siya Ram".

Vishva Hindu Parishad also chanted the Slogans of Jai Siya Ram in the Supreme Court in 1992.

Usage

Gain popularity in late 1980s 
In the late 1980's, the slogan "Jai Shri Ram" was used and gained popularity in Ramanand Sagar's television series Ramayan, where it was used by Hanuman and the "Vaanar Sena" (monkey army) as a war cry when they fought the demon army of Ravan in order to free Ram's wife Sita.

The nationalistic organisation Vishva Hindu Parishad and its Sangh Parivar allies, including the Bharatiya Janata Party, used it in their Ayodhya Ram Janmabhoomi movement. Volunteers at Ayodhya at the time would write the slogan on their skin, using their own blood as ink to signify their devotion. The organizations also distributed a cassette named as Jai Shri Ram, containing songs like "Ram ji ki sena chali" and "Aya samay jawano jago". All the songs in the cassette were set to the tunes of popular Bollywood songs. Kar sevaks, led by the Sangh Parivar allies, chanted the slogan when laying a foundation east of the Babri Masjid in August 1992.

A 1995 essay published in Manushi, a journal edited by academic Madhu Kishwar, described how the Sangh Parivar's usage of "Jai Shri Ram", as opposed to "Sita-Ram", lies in the fact that their violent ideas had "no use for a non-macho Ram." This also mobilised more people politically, since it was patriarchal. Further, the movement was exclusively associated with Ram's birth, which had occurred many years before his marriage to Sita.

The Hindu nationalist portrayal of Ram is warrior-like, as opposed to the traditional "tender, almost effeminate" Ram that has been in popular perception. Sociologist Jan Breman writes:

In Violent Incidents 
 In 1992, during riots and the demolition of the Babri Masjid, the same slogan was raised. Former BBC Bureau Chief Mark Tully, who was present at the site of the Masjid on 6 December, recalls the usage of the slogan "Jai Shri Rama!" by the Hindu crowds rushing towards the mosque.
 In January 1999, the slogan was heard again when Australian missionary doctor Graham Staines was burned alive with his two children in Manoharpur, Orissa.
 In the events leading up to the Godhra train burning of February 2002, supporters of the Gujarat VHP and its affiliated organisations like the Bajrang Dal forced Muslims to chant "Jai Shri Ram" on their journey to Ayodhya, and on their return journey, they did the same at "every other station", including at Godhra. Both journeys were taken in the Sabarmati Express for the ceremony at the Ram Janmabhoomi. During the 2002 Gujarat riots that followed, the slogan was used in a leaflet distributed by the VHP to encourage Hindus to boycott Muslim businesses.
 "Jai Shri Ram" was also chanted by the mob that attacked and killed Ehsan Jafri, a former Member of Parliament from Ahmedabad. He was also forced to chant the slogan before he was brutally murdered.
 The slogan was also heard from the mob during the Naroda Patiya massacre. People living in mixed-religion neighborhoods were forced to put up Jai Shri Ram posters and wear armbands to ward off the rioters.
 The victim in the 2019 Jharkhand mob lynching was forced by the mob to chant "Jai Shree Ram" and "Jai Hanuman".
 All India Democratic Women's Association, the women's wing of CPI(M), alleged that the perpetrators of the 2020 Gargi College molestations were chanting the slogan.
 During the 2020 Delhi riots, rioters were reported to have kept chanting "Jai Shri Ram" while beating their victims. The police were also found to join in the chant while siding with the Hindu mobs. The Muslims were told Hindustan me rehna hoga, Jai Shri Ram kehna hoga. Indian journalist Rana Ayyub, writing in Time, commented that the slogan had become a "racist dog whistle" against Muslims during the riots.

There have been some reports of violent incidents being associated with the slogan, in which the allegations were later found to be false. In June 2019, a group of prominent Indian citizens wrote a letter to Prime Minister Narendra Modi, requesting him to put a stop "to the name of Ram being defiled" as a war cry. They demanded that strict action be taken against using the slogan for violent purposes.

 After the BJP's landslide victory in 2022 Uttar Pradesh Legislative Assembly election , a 25 year old muslim man, Babar Ali from UP's Kushinagar district was lynched and killed by the members of his own community for supporting BJP. His family claimed that Babar was returning from his shop when he chanted ‘Jai Shri Ram’ and was attacked by some local muslims.

Politics 
In June 2019, the slogan was used to heckle Muslim MPs as they proceeded to take their oath in the 17th Lok Sabha. In July that year, Nobel laureate Amartya Sen stated in a speech that the slogan was "not associated with the Bengali culture", leading to some unknown groups publishing his statement on billboards in Kolkata. The slogan has also been used to heckle West Bengal Chief Minister Mamata Banerjee on multiple occasions, triggering angry reactions from her.

In Popular Culture 
The slogan is painted on the walls of a mandir in a house in the 1994 film Hum Aapke Hain Koun..!. It is used as a salutation in the 2015 film Bajrangi Bhaijaan. A 2017 Bhojpuri film, Pakistan Me Jai Shri Ram depicts the hero as a devotee of Ram who enters Pakistan and kills terrorists while chanting the slogan. Stickers stating Hello nahin, bolo Jai Sri Rama became popular on the vehicles and telephones of people running small businesses. A 2018 song, "Hindu Blood Hit", features psychedelic repetitions of the slogan and goes on to warn Indian Muslims that their time is up. Another song from 2017, "Jai Shree Ram DJ Vicky Mix", hopes for a time in the future in which "there will continue to be a Kashmir but no Pakistan". The song "Jai Shree Ram" is part of the film music in the 2022 action-adventure Ram Setu.

Other Usage 
Following the ground-breaking ceremony of the Ram Temple, Ayodhya, in August 2020, the slogan was used as a chant in celebrations. The slogan was used by lawyers after the 2019 Supreme Court verdict on Ayodhya dispute. In 2022, people in Virginia celebrated Dussehra by burning effigies of Ravana while chanting of 'Jai Shri Ram'. In February 2023, Two Shaligrams boulders expected to be used for the construction of idols of Rama, arrived In Ayodhya from Nepal. Rama's devotees celebrated it with chanting Of ‘Jai Shri Ram’.

See also
 Jai Shri Krishna
 Radhe Radhe
 Jai Siya Ram

Notes

References

External links
  – The Indian Express

Vishva Hindu Parishad
Sangh Parivar
Ayodhya dispute
Anti-Muslim violence in India
Chants
Slogans
Rama
Battle cries